Sympistis infixa, the broad-lined sallow moth, is a moth in the family Noctuidae (the owlet moths). It was described by Francis Walker in 1856 and is found in North America.

The MONA or Hodges number for Sympistis infixa is 10065.

References

 Crabo L, Davis M, Hammond P, Mustelin T, Shepard J (2013). "Five new species and three new subspecies of Erebidae and Noctuidae (Insecta, Lepidoptera) from Northwestern North America, with notes on Chytolita Grote (Erebidae) and Hydraecia Guenée (Noctuidae)". ZooKeys 264: 85-123.
 Lafontaine, J. Donald & Schmidt, B. Christian (2010). "Annotated check list of the Noctuoidea (Insecta, Lepidoptera) of North America north of Mexico". ZooKeys, vol. 40, 1–239.

Further reading

 Arnett, Ross H. (2000). American Insects: A Handbook of the Insects of America North of Mexico. CRC Press.

infixa
Moths described in 1856